Shannonia is a genus of flies in the family Sciomyzidae, the marsh flies or snail-killing flies.

Species
Shannonia costalis (Walker, 1837)
Shannonia meridionalis Zuska, 1969

References

Sciomyzidae
Sciomyzoidea genera